Shohada Rural District may refer to:
 Shohada Rural District (Mazandaran Province)
 Shohada Rural District (Meybod County), Yazd province